Mrs. Brown, You've Got a Lovely Daughter is a 1968 British musical comedy film starring Peter Noone. The film showcases the British rock band, Herman's Hermits, and is their second and final feature film, following Hold On! in 1966. In Mrs. Brown, You've Got a Lovely Daughter the group sings nine songs including the title track and the romantic hit song "There's a Kind of Hush".

It was shot at Shepperton Studios and on location around London and Manchester, including King's Cross Station, Covent Garden, St Katharine Docks and the Great West Road. The greyhound racing scenes were shot at the Catford Stadium and White City Stadium. The film's sets were designed by the art director George Provis.

Plot
Herman Tulley inherits a prize greyhound called Mrs. Brown and aims to race the dog and win the derby in London. Herman and his group, The Hermits, play gigs to raise money for the race entry fees. After Mrs. Brown wins the preliminaries in Manchester, The Hermits travel to London for the big race. However, they must again raise money to enter their greyhound, so they make arrangements for more concerts and also take up temporary employment at G.G. Brown's fruit market. During this time, Herman falls for Judy, an aspiring young model who is the Browns' daughter, but Tulip has her sights set on Herman. Mrs. Brown wins the London race, but is later lost by Herman after he ties her to a baggage cart at a busy railway station. She eventually is found by a street entertainer and returned and gives birth to a "daughter." Judy does modeling in Rome. Herman winds up moving on with the hint of a possible relationship with Tulip.

Cast

Critical reception
In DVD Talk, Bill Gibron wrote "It's almost impossible to embrace this movie as well made and amusing. It is an entertaining antique, but that's about it." In The Spinning Image, Graeme Clark described the film as "something of an improvement on the Hermits' previous movie, Hold On!...The songs are better...what you're left with is an artefact that was not intended to last down the ages, but has anyway."

References

External links
 
 
 

1968 films
1968 musical comedy films
British musical comedy films
Jukebox musical films
Metro-Goldwyn-Mayer films
Films scored by Ron Goodwin
Films set in London
Films shot in London
Films set in Manchester
1960s sports films
British sports comedy films
Films and television featuring Greyhound racing
Films shot at Shepperton Studios
Films shot in Greater Manchester
Greyhound racing films
1960s English-language films
1960s British films